Events from the year 1994 in the United States.

Incumbents

Federal government 
 President: Bill Clinton (D-Arkansas)
 Vice President: Al Gore (D–Tennessee)
 Chief Justice: William Rehnquist (Wisconsin)
 Speaker of the House of Representatives: Tom Foley (D–Washington)
 Senate Majority Leader: George J. Mitchell (D–Maine)
 Congress: 103rd

Events

January 

 January – The National Archives at College Park opens.
 January 6 – In Detroit, Michigan, Nancy Kerrigan is clubbed on the right leg by an assailant, under orders from figure skating rival Tonya Harding's ex-husband.
 January 11 – The Superhighway Summit is held at UCLA's Royce Hall. It is the first conference to discuss the growing information superhighway and is presided over by U.S. Vice President Al Gore.
 January 14 – U.S. President Bill Clinton and Russian President Boris Yeltsin sign the Kremlin accords, which stop the preprogrammed aiming of nuclear missiles toward each country's targets, and also provide for the dismantling of the nuclear arsenal in Ukraine.
 January 17 – The 6.5–6.7  Northridge earthquake shakes the Greater Los Angeles Area with a maximum Mercalli intensity of IX (Violent), leaving 57 people dead and more than 8,700 injured.
 January 19 – Record cold temperatures hit the eastern United States. The coldest temperature ever measured in Indiana state history, is recorded in New Whiteland, Indiana.
 January 20 – In South Carolina, Shannon Faulkner becomes the first female cadet to attend The Citadel, but soon drops out.
 January 25 – U.S. President Bill Clinton delivers his first State of the Union address, calling for health care reform, a ban on assault weapons, and welfare reform.
 January 30 – Super Bowl XXVIII: The Dallas Cowboys hand the Buffalo Bills their fourth consecutive Super Bowl loss, 30–13.

February
 February 1 – In Portland, Oregon, Tonya Harding's ex-husband Jeff Gillooly pleads guilty for his role in attacking figure skater Nancy Kerrigan. He accepts a plea bargain, admitting to racketeering charges in exchange for testimony against Harding.
 February 3 – William Perry is sworn in as the new Secretary of Defense, succeeding Les Aspin.
 February 22 – Aldrich Ames and his wife are charged with spying for the Soviet Union by the United States Department of Justice. Ames is later convicted and sentenced to life imprisonment; his wife receives five years in prison.
 February 28 – United States F-16 pilots shoot down four Serbian fighter aircraft over Bosnia and Herzegovina for violation of the Operation Deny Flight and its no-fly zone.

March
 March 1
 A lone terrorist kills Ari Halberstam during an attack on 14 Jewish students on the Brooklyn Bridge in New York City.
 Mary Ellen Withrow begins her term as Treasurer of the United States, serving under President Bill Clinton.
 March 7 – Campbell v. Acuff-Rose Music, Inc.: The Supreme Court of the United States rules that parodies of an original work are generally covered by the doctrine of fair use.
 March 15 – U.S. troops are withdrawn from Somalia.
 March 16 – In Portland, Oregon, Tonya Harding pleads guilty to conspiracy to hinder prosecution for trying to cover-up an attack on figure skating rival Nancy Kerrigan. She is fined $100,000 and banned from the sport.
 March 17 – Serial killer Dana Sue Gray is arrested in California in connection with three murders and one attempted murder of elderly women.
 March 21 – The 66th Academy Awards, hosted by Whoopi Goldberg, are held at Dorothy Chandler Pavilion in Los Angeles. Steven Spielberg's Holocaust drama, Schindler's List, wins seven Oscars out of 12 nominations, including Best Picture and Best Director. The telecast garners over 46.2 million viewers.
 March 23 – Green Ramp disaster: Two military aircraft collide over Pope Air Force Base, North Carolina, causing 24 fatalities and over 100 injuries.
 March 27 – The biggest tornado outbreak in 1994 occurs in the southeastern United States; one tornado hits a Goshen United Methodist Church in Piedmont, Alabama, killing 22 people.

April

 April 8 – Kurt Cobain, songwriter and frontman for the band Nirvana, is found dead at his Lake Washington home. It would be later be confirmed that Cobain had committed suicide three days prior.
 April 22 – Former President Richard Nixon dies in New York City at 81. He is buried at his presidential library on April 26, following a state funeral.
 April 25 – The largest high school arson ever in the United States is started at Burnsville High School, in Burnsville, Minnesota, resulting in over 15 million dollars in damages. The same arsonist also goes on to set fires at Edina High School and Minnetonka High School.

May
 May 10 – Illinois executes serial killer John Wayne Gacy by lethal injection for the murder of 33 young men and boys.
 May 19 – Jacqueline Kennedy Onassis, former First Lady of the United States, dies of cancer at the age of 64.

June
 June 12 – Nicole Brown Simpson and Ronald Goldman are murdered outside the Simpson home in Los Angeles. O. J. Simpson is later acquitted of the killings, but is held liable in a civil suit.
 June 14 – The New York Rangers defeat the Vancouver Canucks, 3–2, in Game 7 of the 1994 Stanley Cup Finals at Madison Square Garden to win their first championship in 54 years.
 June 15 – Walt Disney Pictures' 32nd feature film, The Lion King, is released in theaters to critical acclaim, making $422,783,777 in the United States ($951,583,777 worldwide). It is the highest-grossing film of the year and the highest grossing traditionally-animated film of all time.
 June 17
NFL star O. J. Simpson and his friend Al Cowlings flee from police in his white Ford Bronco. The low-speed chase ends at Simpson's Brentwood, Los Angeles, California mansion, where he surrenders.
The 1994 FIFA World Cup begins in the United States.
 June 20 – Dean Mellberg kills four and injures 23 at Fairchild Air Force Base in Spokane, Washington.
 June 22 – The Houston Rockets defeat the New York Knicks at The Summit in Texas in Game 7 of the 1993–94 NBA season, to win their first NBA Championship.
 June 24 – 1994 Fairchild Air Force Base B-52 crash: U.S. Air Force pilot Bud Holland crashes a B-52 in Fairchild Air Force Base, Washington as a result of pilot error.
 June 30–July 10 – Tropical Storm Alberto causes heavy flooding, intense winds and extensive problems directly over the Southeastern United States and the Caribbean Islands. Thirty two individuals are directly killed by the storm, and property damage is assessed at $1 billion (1994 USD).

July
 July 5 – Amazon is founded by Jeff Bezos.
 July 6 – Fourteen firefighters die in the South Canyon wildfire on Storm King Mountain in Colorado. The event inspires the 1999 book Fire on the Mountain.
 July 19 – Four 26-pound ceiling tiles fall from the roof of the Kingdome in Seattle, Washington, just hours before a scheduled Seattle Mariners game.

August
 August 3 – Stephen Breyer is sworn in as an Associate Justice on the Supreme Court.
 August 12 – Woodstock '94 begins in Saugerties, New York, celebrating the 25-year anniversary of the 1969 Woodstock festival.
The 1994-95 MLB Strike begins; lasting 232 days.
 August 20 – In Honolulu, Hawaii, during a circus international performance, an elephant named Tyke crushes her trainer Allen Campbell to death before hundreds of horrified spectators at the Neal Blaisdell Arena.
 August 23 – Eugene Bullard is posthumously commissioned as a Second Lieutenant in the United States Air Force, 33 years after his death, and 77 years to the day after his rejection for U.S. military service in 1917.

September
 September 8 – USAir Flight 427, a Boeing 737 with 132 people on board, crashes on approach to Pittsburgh International Airport; there are no survivors.
 September 10 – The Magic School Bus debuts on PBS.
 September 12 – Frank Eugene Corder crashes a Cessna 150 into the South Lawn of the White House; he is killed, and is the sole casualty.
 September 13 
President Bill Clinton signs the Federal Assault Weapons Ban, which bans the manufacture of new firearms with certain features for a period of 10 years.
 President Bill Clinton signs the Violence Against Women Act of 1994 (VAWA). The Act provided $1.6 billion toward investigation and prosecution of violent crimes against women, imposed automatic and mandatory restitution on those convicted, and allowed civil redress in cases prosecutors chose not to prosecute. The Act also established the Office on Violence Against Women within the Department of Justice.
September 14 – The World Series is cancelled for the first time in 90 years due to a strike by the MLB Players Association. 
 September 15 – September 21 – Hurricane Gert crosses from the Atlantic to the Pacific Ocean through Central America and Mexico.
 September 17 – Heather Whitestone becomes the first hearing impaired contestant to win the Miss America entitlement. Whitestone becomes Miss America 1995.
 September 19 – American troops stage a bloodless invasion of Haiti in order to restore the legitimate elected leader, Jean-Bertrand Aristide, to power.
 September 22 – The pilot episode of Friends airs on NBC.
 September 24 – The Marvel Action Hour, featuring animated adaptations of Iron Man and the Fantastic Four, debuts in syndication.
September–October – Iraq disarmament crisis: Iraq threatens to stop cooperating with UNSCOM inspectors and begins to once again deploy troops near its border with Kuwait. In response, the U.S. begins to deploy troops to Kuwait.

Undated:
 September – Trudy McFall and Nancy Rase found "Homes for America" in Annapolis, Maryland.

October
 October 12
 NASA loses radio contact with the Magellan spacecraft as the probe descends into the thick atmosphere of Venus (the spacecraft presumably burned up in the atmosphere either October 13 or October 14).
 Steven Spielberg, Jeffrey Katzenberg and David Geffen found DreamWorks Animation.
 October 15 
Iraq disarmament crisis: Following threats by the U.N. Security Council and the U.S., Iraq withdraws troops from its border with Kuwait.
After three years of U.S. exile, Haiti's president Aristide returns to his country.
 October 29 – Francisco Martin Duran fires over 2 dozen shots at the White House; he is later convicted of trying to kill President Bill Clinton.
 October 31 – An American Eagle ATR 72 crashes in Roselawn, Indiana, after circling in icy weather, killing 64 passengers.

November

 November 4 – The first conference devoted entirely to the subject of the commercial potential of the World Wide Web opens in San Francisco. Featured speakers include Marc Andreessen of Netscape, Mark Graham of Pandora Systems, and Ken McCarthy of E-Media.
 November 5 – Former U.S. President Ronald Reagan announces that he has Alzheimer's disease.
 November 7 – WXYC, the student radio station of the University of North Carolina at Chapel Hill, provides the world's first internet radio broadcast.
 November 8–21 – Hurricane Gordon strikes the Caribbean Islands and the Southeastern United States, causing 1,147 deaths (of which 1,122 are in Haiti) and US$514M in damage (estimated, 1994 dollars).
 November 8 – Republican Revolution: Georgia Representative Newt Gingrich leads the Republican Party in taking control of both the House of Representatives and the Senate in midterm congressional elections, the first time in 40 years the Republicans secure control of both houses of Congress. George W. Bush is elected Governor of Texas.
 November 11 – The Santa Clause, directed by John Pasquin, is released in theatres.
 November 16 – A federal judge issues a temporary restraining order prohibiting California from implementing Proposition 187, which would have denied most public services to illegal aliens.
 November 28 – At the Columbia Correctional Institution, serial killer Jeffrey Dahmer and murderer Jesse Anderson are attacked by fellow inmate Christopher Scarver. Dahmer dies on the way to the hospital and Anderson dies two days later.
 November 30
 The National Football League announces that the Jacksonville Jaguars will become the league's 30th franchise.
 Rapper Tupac Shakur is shot five times and robbed after entering the lobby of Quad Recording Studios in Manhattan.

December
 December – The unemployment rate drops to 5.5%, the lowest since the start of the early 1990s recession in July 1990.
 December 1 – Home & Garden Television debuts. 
December 3 – The first PlayStation is released.
 December 14 
A Learjet piloted by Richard Anderson and Brad Sexton misses an elementary school and crashes into an apartment complex in Fresno, California, killing both pilots and injuring several apartment residents.
A runaway Santa Fe freight train rear ends a Union Pacific train at the bottom of Cajon Pass, California.
 December 19
A planned exchange rate correction of the Mexican Peso to the US Dollar creates a massive financial meltdown in Mexico, unleashing the 'Tequila Effect' on global financial markets. This prompts a US$50 billion 'bailout' by the Clinton Administration.
The Whitewater scandal investigation begins in Washington, D.C.
 December 21 – A homemade bomb explodes on the #4 train on Fulton Street in New York City.
 December 27 – After experiencing a hacker attack by Kevin Mitnick, computer security expert Tsutomu Shimomura started to receive prank calls that popularized the trope "My kung fu is stronger than yours".

Ongoing
 Iraqi no-fly zones (1991–2003)
 Operation Uphold Democracy (1994–1995)

Undated

Sport
June 14 – The New York Rangers win their fourth (and first since 1940) Stanley Cup by defeating the Vancouver Canucks 4 games to 2. The deciding Game 7 was played at Madison Square Garden in New York City. Corpus Christi, Texas' Brian Leetch becomes the first American to be awarded the Conn Smythe Trophy.
July 6 – The Canadian Football League establish the Las Vegas Posse, Shreveport Pirates, and Baltimore Stallions.
November 27 – The BC Lions win their third Grey Cup by defeating the Baltimore Stallions 26–23 in the 82nd Grey Cup played at BC Place Stadium in Vancouver, British Columbia. New Iberia, Louisiana's Karl Anthony is awarded the game's Most Valuable Player.
The 1994 NBA Finals was won by the Houston Rockets. The Rockets defeated the New York Knicks in a hard-fought seven games series. Hakeem Olajuwon was named MVP of the Finals.

Births

January 

 January 6 – Jameis Winston, American football player
 January 10 – Landon Collins, American football player
 January 11 – Lindsay Arnold, dancer
 January 14 – Derrick Henry, American football player
 January 21 – Booboo Stewart, actor
 January 23 – Addison Russell, baseball player

February 

 February 1 – Skylar Laine, singer
 February 10 – Makenzie Vega, American actress
 February 11 – Dansby Swanson, baseball player
 February 14 – Vaush, political youtuber
 February 15 – Sodapoppin, twitch streamer and youtuber 
 February 17 – Angie Miller, musician
 February 21 – Hayley Orrantia, actress
 February 23 – Dakota Fanning, actress
 February 24 – Earl Sweatshirt, hip-hop artist

March 

 March 1 – Tyreek Hill, American football player
 March 7
 Christina Gao, figure skater
 Chase Kalisz, swimmer 
 March 10 – JoJo, WWE ring announcer 
 March 12 – Christina Grimmie, singer/songwriter/musician/actress/YouTuber (d. 2016)
 March 14
 Ansel Elgort, actor/singer/DJ
 Nick Goepper, freestyle skier
 March 17 – Amber Holcomb, singer
 March 23 – Tee Grizzley, rapper
 March 25 – Justin Prentice, actor
 March 26 – Paige VanZant, martial artist & pro wrestler
 March 30 – Alex Bregman, baseball player

April 

 April 14 – Skyler Samuels, actress
 April 15 – Jacquees (Rodriquez Jacquees Broadnax), singer/songwriter
 April 16 
 Albert Almora, baseball player
 Will Fuller, American football player
 Liliana Mumy, actress and voice actress
 April 18 – Aminé, rapper
 April 24 – Jordan Fisher, singer/dancer/actor
 April 25 – Maggie Rogers, singer-songwriter and record producer 
 April 27 – Corey Seager, American baseball player
 April 29 – Nash Carter, pro wrestler

May 

 May 4 – Alexander Gould, actor
 May 5 – Celeste, singer
 May 7 – Dylan Gelula, actress
 May 8 – Zach Tinker, actor
 May 16
 Miles Heizer, actor
 Omos Nigerian-American pro wrestler
 May 22 – Aly Raisman, artistic gymnast
 May 24 – Cayden Boyd, actor
 May 25
 Kylee, Japanese-American singer
 Ryan Santiago, singer
 May 26 – Alan Bersten, dancer
 May 28 – Alec Benjamin, singer
 May 31 – Lil Aaron, rapper and singer

June 

 June 3 – Anne Winters, actress
 June 6 – QTCinderella, twitch streamer and youtuber
 June 8 – Liv Morgan, pro wrestler
 June 17
 Amari Cooper, American football player
 Shaq Lawson, American football player
 June 18 – Takeoff, rapper (d. 2022)
 June 20 – Leonard Williams, American football player
 June 24 – Matt Turner, soccer player
 June 29 – Camila Mendes, actress
 June 30 – Josh Rojas, baseball player

July 

 July 6 
Andrew Benintendi, baseball player
Corey Coleman, American football player
 July 16 – Mark Indelicato, American actor
 July 22 – Jaz Sinclair, actress
 July 20 – Maia Shibutani, ice dancer 
 July 27 – Eugenia Cooney, youtuber

August 

 August 2
 Cr1TiKaL,  YouTuber and Twitch streamer  
 Laremy Tunsil, American football player
 August 3 – Todd Gurley, American football player
 August 4 – Bobby Shmurda (Ackquille Jean Pollard), rapper/songwriter
 August 9 – Kelli Hubly, American soccer player
 August 11 – Alejandro Aranda, singer
 August 12 – Bex Taylor-Klaus, actress
 August 16 – Tippy Dos Santos, actress and singer
 August 17
Jack Conklin, American football player
Taissa Farmiga, actress
 August 20 – Jonathon Lillis, freestyle skier 
 August 21 – Jacqueline Emerson, actress
 August 22 – Israel Broussard, actor
 August 27 – Ellar Coltrane, actor

September 

 September 1 – Betty Cantrell, Miss America 2016
 September 8 – Cameron Dallas, internet personality 
 September 13 – Mitch Holleman, actor
 September 29
 Halsey (Ashley Nicolette Frangipane), singer/songwriter
 Paul Denino, internet personality

October 
 October 14 – Jared Goff, American football player
 October 23 – Margaret Qualley, actress
 October 24
 Krystal Jung, actress and singer
 Jalen Ramsey, American football player
 October 26 – Allie DeBerry, American actress and model

November 

 November 2 – Jordan Howard, American football player
 November 4 – Deion Jones, American football player
 November 7 – Gervonta Davis, boxer
 November 8 – Lauren Alaina, singer
 November 10 – Zoey Deutch, actress
 November 11 – Lio Rush, pro wrestler
 November 15
 Tyler Boyd, American football player
 Emma Dumont, American actress, model, and dancer
 November 30 – Nyjah Huston, skateboarder

December 

 December 3 – Jake T. Austin, actor
 December 7 – Hunter Henry, American football player
 December 8 – Trevor Daniel, American football player  
 December 9 – Zach Veach, race car driver
 December 12 – Otto Warmbier, college student who was detained in North Korea (d. 2017)
 December 16 – Christopher Bell, race car driver
 December 17 – Nat Wolff, actor
 December 20
 DaniLeigh, singer  
 Pouya, rapper 
 December 22 – Calvin Tankman, pro wrestler 
 December 23 – Tajae Sharpe, American football player
 December 24 – LaShawn Tináh Jefferies, actress
 December 26 
 Dalyn Dawkins, American football player
 Javianne Oliver, sprinter

Deaths

January 

 January 1 –  Cesar Romero, American actor (born 1907)
 January 3 – Frank Belknap Long, American writer (born 1901)
 January 5 – Tip O'Neill, American politician (born 1912)
 January 8 – Pat Buttram, American actor (born 1915)
 January 9 – Johnny Temple, American baseball player and sportscaster (born 1927)
 January 12 – Samuel Bronston, American film producer and director (born 1908)
 January 14 – Esther Ralston, American actress (born 1902)
 January 15 – Harry Nilsson, American musician (born 1941)
 January 17 – Helen Stephens, American athlete (born 1918)
 January 22
 Frances Gifford, American actress (born 1920)
 Telly Savalas, American actor (born 1922)
 January 25 – Stephen Cole Kleene, American mathematician (born 1909)
 January 27 – Claude Akins, American actor (born 1926)
 January 28 – Hal Smith, American actor (born 1916)
 January 29 – Nick Cravat, American actor and acrobat (born 1912)

February 

 February 1 – Olan Soule, American actor (b. 1909)
 February 2 – Marija Gimbutas, Lithuanian-American archeologist (b. 1921)
 February 6 
 Joseph Cotten, American actor (b. 1905)
 Jack Kirby, comic book artist (born 1917)
 February 9 
 Howard Martin Temin, American geneticist (b. 1934)
 Bud Wilkinson, football player, coach and broadcaster (born 1916)
 February 11
 Sorrell Booke, actor (born 1930)
 William Conrad, actor (born 1920)
 February 12 – Donald Judd, American artist (b. 1928)
 February 14 – Christopher Lasch, American historian, moralist, and social critic (b. 1932)
 February 17 – Randy Shilts, journalist and author (b. 1951)
 February 24 – Dinah Shore, American actress and singer (b. 1917)
 February 25
 Baruch Goldstein, American-Israeli physician, religious extremist, and mass murderer (b. 1956)
 Jersey Joe Walcott, American boxer (b. 1914)
 February 26 – Bill Hicks, American comedian (b. 1961)

March 

 March 2 – Anita Morris, actress/singer/dancer (b. 1943)
 March 4 – John Candy, Canadian comedian and actor (b. 1950)
 March 9 – Charles Bukowski, American writer (b. 1920)
 March 13 – Danny Barker, American musician (b. 1909)
 March 17 – Ellsworth Vines, American tennis player (b. 1911)
 March 21
 Macdonald Carey, American actor (b. 1913)
 Lili Damita, French-American actress and singer (b. 1904)
 Dack Rambo, American actor (b. 1941)
 March 22
 Dan Hartman, American musician (b. 1950)
 Walter Lantz, American cartoonist (b. 1899)
 March 28 – Ira Murchison, American athlete (b. 1933)

April  

 April 2 – Betty Furness, American actress, author, and consumer advocate (b. 1916)
 April 5 – Kurt Cobain, American singer and songwriter (b. 1967)
 April 6 – Sheck Exley, American cave diver (b. 1949)
 April 16 – Ralph Ellison, American writer (b. 1914)
 April 17 – Roger Wolcott Sperry, American neurobiologist (b. 1913)
 April 22 – Richard Nixon, 37th President of the United States (b. 1913)
 April 29 – Russell Kirk, American political philosopher (b. 1918)
 April 30 – Richard Scarry, American author (b. 1919)

May 

 May 5 – Joe Layton, American director and choreographer (b. 1931)
 May 7 – Clement Greenberg, American art critic (b. 1909)
 May 8 – George Peppard, American actor (b. 1928)
 May 10 – John Wayne Gacy, American serial killer (b. 1942)
 May 12
 Erik Erikson, Danish-American developmental psychologist (b. 1902)
 Roy J. Plunkett, American chemist (b. 1910)
 May 14 – W. Graham Claytor, Jr., American businessman and naval officer (b. 1914)
 May 15
 Royal Dano, American actor (b. 1922)
 Gilbert Roland, American actor (b. 1905)
 May 19
 Henry Morgan, American comedian (b. 1915)
 Jacqueline Kennedy Onassis, American socialite, conservationist, and First Lady of the United States (b. 1929)
 May 26 – Sonny Sharrock, American jazz musician (b. 1940)
 May 28 – Julius Boros, American golfer (b. 1920)
 May 30 – Ezra Taft Benson, American religious leader (b. 1899)

June 

 June 1 – Frances Heflin, actress (b. 1923)
 June 4 – Stephen McNally, American actor (b. 1911)
 June 6 – Barry Sullivan, American actor (b. 1912)
 June 8 – Dorothy Shoemaker McDiarmid, legislator from Virginia (b. 1906)
 June 10 
 Mary Maxwell Gates, American businesswoman (b. 1929)
 Edward Kienholz, American artist and sculptor (b. 1927)
 June 12
 Ron Goldman, American model, waiter (b. 1968)
 Menachem Mendel Schneerson, American Hasidic rabbinical leader (b. 1902)
 Nicole Brown Simpson, wife of O. J. Simpson/murder victim (b. 1959)
 June 13 – K. T. Stevens, American actress (b. 1919)
 June 14 – Henry Mancini, American composer and arranger (b. 1924)
 June 16 – Kristen Pfaff, American bassist (b. 1967)
 June 20 – Jay Miner, American computer pioneer (b. 1932)
 June 21 – William Wilson Morgan, American astronomer and astrophysicist (b. 1906)
 June 23 – Marv Throneberry, American baseball player (b. 1933)

July 

 July 7
 Anita Garvin, American actress (b. 1907) 
 Cameron Mitchell, American actor (b. 1918)
 July 8 – Dick Sargent, American actor (b. 1930)
 July 11 – Gary Kildall, American computer inventor (b. 1942)
 July 16 – Julian Schwinger, American physicist (b. 1918)

August 
 August 16 – John Doucette, American actor (b. 1921)
 August 17 – Jack Sharkey, American boxer (b. 1902)
 August 19 – Linus Pauling, American chemist (b. 1901)
 August 21 – Danitra Vance, comedian/actress (b. 1954)

September 
 September 7 – Dennis Morgan, American actor and singer (b. 1908)
 September 9 – Patrick O'Neal, American actor (b. 1927)
 September 11 – Jessica Tandy, English-born American actress (b. 1909)
 September 12 – Tom Ewell, American actor (b. 1909)
 September 15 – Mark Stevens, American actor (b. 1916)
 September 16 – Jack Dodson, actor (b. 1931)
 September 17
 John Delafose, accordion player (b. 1939)
 Vitas Gerulaitis, American tennis player (b. 1954)
 September 20 – Jule Styne, English-born American songwriter (b. 1905)
 September 23 – Robert Bloch, American writer (b. 1917)

October 
 October 2 – Harriet Nelson, American actress (b. 1909)
 October 3 – Dub Taylor, American actor (b. 1907)
 October 19 – Martha Raye, actress and comedian (b. 1916)
 October 20 – Burt Lancaster, American actor (b. 1913)
 October 23 – Robert Lansing, American actor (b. 1928)
 October 24 – Raúl Juliá, Puerto Rican-American actor and singer (b. 1940)
 October 25 – Mildred Natwick, American actress (b. 1905)

November 

 November 1 – Noah Beery Jr., American actor (b. 1913)
 November 4 – Sam Francis, American painter (b. 1923)
 November 10 – Carmen McRae, American jazz singer (b. 1922)
 November 12 – Wilma Rudolph, American athlete (b. 1940)
 November 13 – John Bailey, actor/screenwriter (b. 1947)
 November 14 – Tom Villard, American actor (b. 1953)
 November 18 – Cab Calloway, American jazz singer and bandleader (b. 1907)
 November 21 – Willem Jacob Luyten, Dutch-American astronomer (b. 1899)
 November 28 – Jeffrey Dahmer, American serial killer (b. 1960)
 November 30 – Lionel Stander, American actor (b. 1908)

December 
 December 12 – Stuart Roosa, American astronaut (b. 1933)
 December 18 – Lilia Skala, Austrian-born American actress (b. 1896)
 December 20 – Dean Rusk, American diplomat, 54th Secretary of State (b. 1909)
 December 24 – John Boswell, American historian (b. 1947)
 December 31 – Woody Strode, American athlete and actor (b. 1914)

See also 
 1994 in American television
 List of American films of 1994
 Timeline of United States history (1990–2009)

References

External links
 

 
1990s in the United States
United States
United States
Years of the 20th century in the United States